Vallanzengo is a comune (municipality) in the Province of Biella in the Italian region Piedmont, located about  northeast of Turin and about  northwest of Biella.

Vallanzengo borders the following municipalities: Bioglio, Callabiana, Camandona, Mosso, Piatto, Quaregna, Trivero, Valle Mosso, Valle San Nicolao.

Demographic evolution

References

Cities and towns in Piedmont